The Italian men's national under 20 ice hockey team is the national under-20 ice hockey team in Italy. The team represents Italy at the International Ice Hockey Federation's IIHF World U20 Championship.

International competitions

References

Junior national ice hockey teams
Junior